Françoise d'Estamville, Dame de Paroy also called Mme de Parois or de Parroys (died 1557), was a French court official. Some French sources give her name and title as, "Françoise d'Estainville, dame de Chevreaul et de Perroye".

Life
She married Jean de Vienne, baron de Chevreaux (in Jura) in 1544.

She succeeded Janet Stewart, Lady Fleming as the governess of queen Mary, Queen of Scots in 1551, and remained in service until 1557. As Mary formally left the Royal Nursery in 1553 and started to attend court as an adult, Paroy's position would essentially be that of a chief lady-in-waiting, though official ladies-in-waitings were not engaged for Mary while she remained unwed.

She wrote in 1553 from Villers-Cotterêts to Mary of Guise, the mother of Mary, Queen of Scots, explaining that the young queen had been ill and her doctors prescribed rhubarb. A Mademoiselle de Curel had left the household after an argument. She was only person left to dress the queen's hair.

A letter written in 1554 from Villers-Cotterêts mentions that the young queen was in good health. She had found a painter for the queen's portrait who had formerly been employed by François de Lorraine (d. 1545) at Nancy, and the portrait would show how the queen had grown. Another letter mentions the young queen's progress in learning Latin. She asked for money for Mary, for mules for transport, and especially for a costume of cloth-of-gold to wear at the wedding of Nicolas, Count of Vaudémont (1524-1577) and Princess Joanna of Savoy-Nemours (1532–1568) at Fontainebleau. Paroy asked permission to buy two diamonds to have a "touret" headband lengthened using rubies and pearls the queen already owned.

Françoise de Paroy was described as a person with irreproachable character.  However, she was not liked by queen Mary. Paroy frequently demanded more funds from Mary of Guise and Scotland to uphold Mary Stuarts' expenses: this was difficult for the poor funds of Scotland, but Paroy was also accused of being partly to blame for the poor monetary situation  and it was hinted though not explicitly said that she may have stolen money.

de Paroy was favored by queen Catherine de Medici and therefore came to be viewed with suspicion, and Mary accused her of talking ill of her to Catherine.

The final conflict occurred in April 1556. de Paroy disliked Mary giving away her dresses to relatives as a deprivation of her own privilege to Mary's old clothes, something which also caused discord with Mary. This conflict resulted in Paroy being essentially relieved from her duties, though she was not formally fired.

She fell ill with dropsy in 1556 and was forced to leave court, and there was talk of a replacement, as it was not considered suitable for Mary to be without a female supervisor.  De Paroy, however, formally kept her office until one year prior to Mary's wedding in 1558, after which Mary was instead given an official lady-in-waiting, Guillemette de Sarrebruck.

She died in Paris on 24 June 1557.

References

 Stoddart, Jane T., The girlhood of Mary queen of Scots from her landing in France in August 1548 to her departure from France in August 1561

1557 deaths
Governesses to the Scottish court
French courtiers
Court of Mary, Queen of Scots
Court of Henry II of France